Rhode Island FC is an upcoming American professional soccer club located in Pawtucket, Rhode Island. The club is planned to debut in the USL Championship in 2024.

History
On December 2, 2019, it was announced that a new soccer-specific stadium would be a centerpiece for a large development project in Pawtucket, Rhode Island. The stadium is proposed to seat at least 10,000 fans and be connected to shops, apartments, offices, and a hotel in the $400-million plan. The initial goal was to have the team playing by 2023.

Due to inflation and delays caused by COVID-19, the project was pushed back until 2022 when the construction began. The team is now expected to begin play in 2024.

On November 14, 2022, the team announced their name as Rhode Island FC and revealed their team crest and colors.

Former Bermuda national team captain Khano Smith, was named the teams first head coach and general manager on March 8, 2023.

References

External links 
 

Soccer clubs in Rhode Island
Sports in Rhode Island
USL Championship teams